Elliott Grant Charles (born 1 April 1990) is an English-born Grenadian footballer who plays as a striker for the Grenada national football team.

Early life
As a youngster Elliot attended St. Gildas Junior School. Aged 10 while playing an inter-borough tournament against St.Mary's he attracted the attention of a scout for Arsenal. He was later scrapped from their youth system. He later attended Bishop Douglass, Finchley.

Career
Charles signed a three-year professional contract with Barnet in May 2008 after scoring 20 goals for the Protec U18 side. He made his debut against Brentford on 23 August 2008. In October 2008 he joined Farnborough on an initial one-month loan period. He then joined Lewes on loan in January 2009 along with Kieron St Aimie, scoring on his debut in the FA Trophy against Havant & Waterlooville. He went out on loan for the third time that season in March, joining Hemel Hempstead Town. A fourth loan spell followed in October 2009 when he joined Ebbsfleet United, before another loan spell at Havant & Waterlooville in December. On 21 January 2010, he was released by Barnet and signed for Kettering, who also released him at the end of the season.

In August 2010, Charles signed for Conference South club Dover Athletic alongside Harry Baker, Luke I'Anson and Jackson Ohakam. He was released at the end of the 2010–11 season. In September 2011, he joined Isthmian League Premier Division side Hendon after a spell with Concord Rangers.

In November 2012, Charles joined Conference South club Eastbourne Borough. He ended the season as the club's top scorer scoring 14 goals in all competitions (11 league) in 26 appearances (24 league).

Before the start of the 2013/14 season, Elliott moved along the south coast to join Eastbourne's league rivals Dover Athletic. After a season at Dover, Elliott re-signed for Eastbourne on the 21/08/2014.

Charles had stints at Staines Town and Metropolitan Police, before rejoining Hendon in January 2017. After leaving at the end of the season, he joined Hampton & Richmond Borough in December 2017. Although he signed in early December, Charles had to be patient for his first action for The Beavers. He finally made his debut away to Wealdstone on New Year's Day 2018. His first start for Hampton couldn't have gone any better for Charles with a Hat-Trick in the first 30 minutes.

On 7 September 2018, Charles joined National League side, Braintree Town. After two appearances, he joined Wealdstone the following month. Charles joined Hendon for a third time in January 2019.

International
Charles was called to play for Grenada the 2014 FIFA World Cup qualification – CONCACAF Second Round. He made two appearances, the first on 2 September 2011 against Belize in the 3–0 home defeat and in the 2–1 away defeat to Saint Vincent and the Grenadines on 18 September.

Career statistics

Club

International

References

External links

1990 births
Living people
English footballers
English sportspeople of Grenadian descent
Association football forwards
Grenadian footballers
Grenada international footballers
Welwyn Garden City F.C. players
Barnet F.C. players
Farnborough F.C. players
Lewes F.C. players
Hemel Hempstead Town F.C. players
Ebbsfleet United F.C. players
Havant & Waterlooville F.C. players
Kettering Town F.C. players
Dover Athletic F.C. players
Concord Rangers F.C. players
Hendon F.C. players
Eastbourne Borough F.C. players
Staines Town F.C. players
Metropolitan Police F.C. players
Ware F.C. players
Hampton & Richmond Borough F.C. players
Braintree Town F.C. players
Wealdstone F.C. players
English Football League players
National League (English football) players
Isthmian League players
Southern Football League players
Black British sportspeople